The 2002 Speedway World Cup Race-off was the fourth race of the 2002 Speedway World Cup season. It took place on August 8, 2002 in the Peterborough Speedway Stadium in Peterborough, Great Britain.

Results

Heat details

References

See also 
 2002 Speedway World Cup
 motorcycle speedway

R